The 1971 Saskatchewan general election was held on June 23, 1971, to elect members of the Legislative Assembly of Saskatchewan.

Under the leadership of Allan Blakeney, the New Democratic Party of Saskatchewan returned to power after seven years in opposition.  The NDP won a majority government, increasing its share of the popular vote by over 10 percentage points.

The Liberal government of Premier Ross Thatcher more or less held its share of the popular vote, but lost a significant number of seats in the legislature in part because of the continuing decline in the share of the vote won by the Progressive Conservative Party, now led by Ed Nasserden.

Ross Thatcher died on July 22, 1971, just shy of a month since losing the election.

Results

Note: * Party did not nominate candidates in previous election.

See also
List of political parties in Saskatchewan
List of Saskatchewan provincial electoral districts

Saskatchewan
1971 in Saskatchewan
1971
June 1971 events in Canada